John Ross Mulholland (7 December 1928 – July 2015) was a Scottish professional footballer who played as a winger.

References

1928 births
Sportspeople from Dumbarton
Footballers from West Dunbartonshire
Scottish footballers
Association football wingers
Renton Guild F.C. players
Plymouth Argyle F.C. players
Grimsby Town F.C. players
Scunthorpe United F.C. players
Grantham Town F.C. players
English Football League players
2015 deaths